The 12th Biathlon European Championships were held in Novosibirsk, Russia from February 16 to February 20, 2005.

There were total of 16 competitions held: sprint, pursuit, individual and relay both for U26 and U21.

Results

U26

Men's

Women's

U21

Men's

Women's

Medal table

External links 
 IBU full results
 All results

Biathlon European Championships
International sports competitions hosted by Russia
2005 in biathlon
2005 in Russian sport
Biathlon competitions in Russia
Sport in Novosibirsk